= Riyadh Ibrahim Hussein =

Doctor and Minister of Health of Iraq

Riyadh Ibrahim Hussein (died 1982) was an Iraqi doctor and official. He served as the Minister of Health in 1982, when he was killed after challenging Saddam Hussein at a cabinet meeting during the Iran-Iraq war and suggesting he temporarily step down. It was widely alleged that Saddam Hussein asked him to step outside during the meeting to discuss further and then the Iraqi leader shot him dead within earshot of the other cabinet ministers. However, in reality, he was dismissed from his ministry in June 1982 and arrested two months later, accused of being a "traitor" and importing a medicine that killed people. According to his daughter, he was tortured and executed by firing squad that autumn.
